is a Japanese actress, voice actress, television personality and model from Funabashi, Chiba, perhaps best known for her role as Momo Maruo in the 1995 Super Sentai series Chōriki Sentai Ohranger, as well as co-hosting O-Sama Brunch, a Tokyo Broadcasting System Saturday morning show. She is affiliated with Petite Smile talent agency.

Filmography

Voice roles

 Pikachu's Rescue Adventure - Narrator
 The King of Fighters '96 (video game) as Athena Asamiya

Live roles
Kaizoku Sentai Gokaiger (Toei, 2011) as Momo Maruo 
Rug Cop (2006)
Nurseman ga Yuku (2004)
Ichiban Taisetsuna Date ~ Tokyo no Sora, Shanghai no Yume (2004)
Kyohansha (2003)
Okaasan to Issho (2003)
Suicide Club (2001)
Tsugumi e... (2000)
Omiai Kekkon (2000)
Mama chari deka (1999)
Hashire Koumuin (1998)
Oatsui no ga Osuki? (NTV, 1998)
Koi wa aserazu (1998)
Love Generation (TV series) (1997)
Gekisou Sentai Carranger vs. Ohranger (Toei, 1997) as Momo Maruo/OhPink
Chōriki Sentai Ohranger vs. Kakuranger (Toei, 1996) as Momo Maruo/OhPink
Choriki  sentai Ohranger The movie ( Toei, 1995) as Momo Maruo / Oh Pink 
Chōriki Sentai Ohranger (Toei, 1995 - 1996) as Momo Maruo/OhPink

References

External links 
 Official profile at Petite Smile 
 Official blog at Oricon 
 Official blog at Ameba 
 
 

Japanese film actresses
Japanese gravure idols
Japanese television actresses
Japanese television personalities
Living people
Japanese voice actresses
1973 births
Voice actors from Funabashi
Voice actresses from Chiba Prefecture
20th-century Japanese actresses
21st-century Japanese actresses